Sibynophis bivittatus, commonly known as the white-striped snake, is a nonvenomous species of colubrid snake found in the Philippines.

References

Sibynophis
Reptiles of the Philippines
Reptiles described in 1894
Taxa named by George Albert Boulenger